West Central is a neighborhood in Spokane, Washington. As the name suggests it is located centrally on the west side of the city. Downtown Spokane is immediately east of the neighborhood, and spreads into West Central along Monroe Street in the Kendall Yards area. The neighborhood is diverse, with single and multi-family residential zones dating back to the early days of Spokane, a new mixed use development on the site of a former rail yard, the Spokane County Courthouse campus and associated government buildings and a few commercial districts. The Spokane River gorge winds around the southern and western edge of the neighborhood. It is home to Nettleton's Addition Historic District, which was added to the National Register of Historic Places in March 2006, and is also the largest historic district on the Washington State Heritage Register (as of 2005).

Geography

The Spokane River gorge is the dominant physical feature of the neighborhood and serves as its southern, western and northwestern boundary as the river winds its way downstream in a generally northwesterly direction away from Downtown Spokane. The terrain falls off dramatically from the largely flat plain of West Central more than 200 feet down to the river. The river separates West Central from the neighborhoods of Peaceful Valley on the south and West Hills on the west. Monroe Street, a major north–south thoroughfare and commercial district, serves as the eastern border of the neighborhood, beyond which lie the neighborhoods of Riverside and Emerson/Garfield. Indiana, an east–west thoroughfare, separates West Central from Emerson/Garfield on the north.

There are three crossings of the Spokane River providing access into West Central. On the eastern edge of the neighborhood the Monroe Street Bridge leads into the heart of downtown, in the center the Maple Street Bridge connects the west end of downtown with West Central, and on the western edge the Sandifur Bridge provides pedestrian access into Peaceful Valley.

The Spokane River Centennial Trail passes through the neighborhood, along the top of the bluff that follows the course of the river. It connects West Central with areas in northwest Spokane and beyond to Nine Mile Falls. To the east it follows the river through downtown Spokane, and out into the Spokane Valley to the Idaho state line.

Kendall Yards

Named for the Kendall Rail Yard that once took up the entirety of the southern section of West Central. The rail yard was moved in the 1970s, but the ground was contaminated by the former use and the site was left empty until the first decade of the 21st century. In the 2000s, a series of proposals for development were floated, but none came to fruition until 2010 when Greenstone Corporation's plan was approved. Since then, the Kendall Yards district has been expanding westward across the abandoned land. It is a mixed-use district with retail and multi-family housing on the east. Density decreases as the neighborhood moves further to the west, away from downtown. The multi-family buildings give way to townhouses and ultimately single-family housing.

The commercial district on the eastern end of Kendall Yards spills directly into Downtown Spokane across Monroe Street. It is home to numerous retail stores, restaurants and a grocery. From spring into fall, a few blocks of Summit Avenue in the heart of the commercial district are closed to automobiles every Wednesday evening for the Kendall Yards Night Market.

Nettleton's Addition Historic District
Nettleton's Addition Historic District makes up a significant portion of the residential area of Spokane's West Central neighborhood.  Originally platted in 1887, 76% of the residential properties in the district were built between 1900 and 1912. Located in the historic district is Doyle's Ice Cream Parlor, which has been serving the neighborhood since 1939.

The district has played a large role in the streetcar-era of Spokane, and also reflects the typical lifecycle of American cities of rapid development, slow decline, and urban renewal.

Nettleton's Addition Historic District is located in the western portion of West Central and bounded on the south by Bridge Street, on the west by Summit and A Streets, on the north by Mission Avenue along the Spokane River bluff and on the east by Chestnut Street. It takes up an area of more than 38 square blocks.

History

For thousands of years, the Spokane people have lived in the place now known as West Central. Fishing camps were established on the banks of the river to take advantage of the great salmon runs in the area. These salmon runs came to an abrupt end in 1915 with the construction of a dam downstream that did not contain a fish ladder.

The first European settlement in the area came in 1879 when a Colonel Jenkins homesteaded in present-day West Central. In 1887, William Nettleton pushed development of the neighborhood forward when he bought and platted 278 acres in the area. The Spokane County Courthouse was completed on the eastern end of the neighborhood, on Broadway a block west of Monroe, in 1895. By the first decade of the 20th century, the neighborhood had been connected by bridge to the downtown core and was seen as a middle-class suburb of the city center. The neighborhood became home to a variety of architectural styles such as American Craftsman, Bungalow, Queen Anne and Victorian.

As the neighborhood grew during this period, the southern portion became dominated by railroads. The Northern Pacific Railroad and 
Union Pacific Railroad laid down lines in what is now Kendall Yards. From the 1880s through the early 1970s the area between Bridge Street and the Spokane River gorge was a rail yard. After the rail yards were abandoned in the 1970s, the southern fringe of West Central sat empty until the Kendall Yards development was constructed in the 21st century.

In 1925, the neighborhood became critical to Spokane's small but active Japanese community. In the decades prior, Japanese immigrants settled on the outskirts of Spokane and set up small vegetable farms. The Spokane Vegetable Growers Association was established by Frank Hirata at 1109 W. Ide Avenue on the eastern edge of West Central. In the middle of the 20th century the association was bought out by Shozo Higashi, who eventually moved it out of the neighborhood.

From 1887 through 1968, a flat area along the riverbank in the northwestern corner of West Central was home to Natatorium Park, a popular amusement park for people from all over the city. Trolley lines were laid around the neighborhood and city, connecting the park with the rest of the Spokane area. Initially known as Ingersoll Park when it was first developed, and then as Twickenham Park to reflect the common name of the area at the time, Twickenham Addition, it took on the Natatorium Park name in 1829. The park was home to a swimming pool, baseball diamond, hotel, casino and numerous amusement rides and roller-coasters. The Looff Carousel that now sits in Riverfront Park was originally housed at Natatorium Park.

Historic places
Along with the historic districts named above, West Central is home to 13 individual properties that are listed on the National Register of Historic Places (NRHP) on their own merit.

|}

Demographics
As of 2017, there were 8,754 residents in the neighborhood across 3,424 households, of which 21.9% had children. 56.7% of households were rented, compared to 45.3% citywide. 23.5% of the residents were aged 19 or younger, compared to 21.9% citywide. Those over 65 made up 10.4% of the population, compared to 14.5% citywide. The median household income was $28,249, compared to $44,768 citywide. 15.8% of the population had a bachelor's degree or higher, while 29.9% had at most a high school diploma. The unemployment rate was 12% compared to 6.5% citywide. 63.1% of students qualify for free or reduced lunch, compared to 54.5% citywide.

Education
West Central is served by Spokane Public Schools and home to one school: Holmes Elementary. Holmes serves the entire West Central neighborhood. It feeds into Yasuhara Middle School in the Logan neighborhood. From there it feeds into North Central High School in the neighboring Emerson/Garfield neighborhood.

Transportation

Surface streets

West Central is aligned with the city's street grid plan. Monroe Street, the Maple/Ash couplet, and Maxwell Avenue are classified by the city as principal arterials, the highest classification for a surface street. East of the Maple/Ash couplet, Boone and Broadway Avenues are classified as minor arterials, while west of Maple/Ash they are classified as major collectors; Indiana Avenue is also classified as a major collector. In Kendall Yards, Summit Parkway is considered a minor collector from Monroe to Cedar Street; Cedar is then considered a minor collector from Summit north to Broadway. Summit Boulevard, running along the crest of the Spokane River Gorge, is a minor collector from Broadway in the south to Mission Avenue and Pettit Drive in the north, as is Belt Street from Maxwell to Boone. The rest of the streets are considered to be local access roads.

For cyclists, a shared use path for non-motorized vehicles runs along the Centennial Trail, paralleling Summit Parkway and Summit Boulevard around the southern, western and northern edge of West Central. A dedicated bike lane runs along Maxwell Avenue.

Public transit
The Spokane Transit Authority, the region's public transportation provider, serves West Central with five fixed route bus lines.

References

Geography of Spokane, Washington
Neighborhoods in Spokane, Washington